Northeast Township may refer to the following townships in the United States:

 Northeast Township, Adams County, Illinois
 Northeast Township, Orange County, Indiana

See also 
 Northeast Madison Township, Perry County, Pennsylvania